
Meigs is a surname. Notable people with the name include:

A 
 Arthur Ingersoll Meigs (1882–1956), American architect

C 
 Charles Delucena Meigs (1792–1869), American obstetrician
 Cornelia Meigs (1884–1973), American children's book author and educator

D 
 Daniel Bishop Meigs (1835–1916), Canadian politician

G 
 George Anson Meigs (1816–1897), American entrepreneur, businessman and shipbuilder

H 
 Henry Meigs (1782–1861), U.S. Congressman from New York
 Henry Meigs, Jr. (1809–1887), American mayor of Bayonne, New Jersey, and president of the New York Stock Exchange

J 
 Joe Vincent Meigs (1892–1963), American obstetrician and gynecologist
 John Rodgers Meigs (1841–1864), Union Army officer during the American Civil War
 Josiah Meigs (1757–1822), American college professor, journalist, and president of the University of Georgia

L 
 Leo O. Meigs (1879–1923), American politician

M 
 Mary Meigs (1917–2002), American-born painter and writer
 Merrill C. Meigs (1883–1968), American newspaper executive and publisher
 Montgomery Meigs (disambiguation), multiple people

P 
 Peveril Meigs (1903–1979), American geographer

R 
 Return Meigs (disambiguation), multiple people

S 
 Sandra Meigs (born 1953), Canadian visual artist

See also
Meigs (disambiguation)
Meiggs (disambiguation)